The Audition is a 2000 short film written and directed by Chad Lowe and starring Lowe, his then wife Hilary Swank, and Brittany Murphy. The plot is about a woman's unhealthy addiction towards a young celebrity that she watched at an audition.

The film aired on Showtime.  Lowe stated that he intended to make a feature-length version to take to film festivals.

Plot

Cast
 Hilary Swank
 Chad Lowe
 Brittany Murphy as Daniella
 Lisa Arning as Nikki
 Jason Bryden
 Nicki Micheaux as Janet
 Shaker Paleja as Pablo

References

External links
 
 Showcom Magazine PDF

American short films
2000 films
2000 short films
2000s English-language films